Arcadia is a city and county seat of DeSoto County, Florida, United States. Its population was 7,637 as of the 2010 census, with an estimated population of 7,722 in 2014. Arcadia's Historic District is listed on the National Register of Historic Places.

History

According to The Atlas of Florida, "The Rev. James Madison ("Boss") Hendry (1839–1922) named the town in honor of Arcadia Albritton (1861–1932), a daughter of Thomas H. and Fannie (Waldron) Albritton, pioneer settlers. Arcadia had baked him a cake for his birthday, and he appreciated it so much that he named the city after her."

In 1886, transportation improved in Arcadia when the Florida Southern Railway (later the Atlantic Coast Line Railroad) was built through Arcadia on its way from Bartow to Punta Gorda.  The railway caused Arcadia to grow significantly, which led to it becoming incorporated a year later.  A second railroad line, the Charlotte Harbor and Northern Railway (later the Seaboard Air Line Railroad), was built through Arcadia from 1907 to 1910 on its way from Mulberry to Boca Grande.  Both lines have since been consolidated into a single line by CSX with the Seaboard line surviving north of Arcadia and the Atlantic Coast Line surviving to the south.  Arcadia was also served by the short-lived East and West Coast Railway, which connected Arcadia with Bradenton from 1915 to 1934.

During the late 19th century Arcadia was the county seat of what would become many counties. In 1921 legislation enacted called for Arcadia to remain the county seat of DeSoto County and resulted in the creation of the present-day counties of Charlotte, Hardee, Glades and Highlands.

On Thanksgiving Day in 1905, the town was destroyed by a large-scale fire that originated from a midtown livery stable. The fire was exacerbated because the town did not have a working water system or fire department. The estimated monetary damage was $250,000, but no loss of life occurred. Much of the business district was not spared. The town recovered only years later.

Oak Street is the "main street" in Arcadia. The downtown is far more elaborate than neighboring counties' downtown areas, as Arcadia is older and was their county seat prior to the formation of their present counties. Arcadia is also home to many early 20th-century homes, houses of worship, and several historic public buildings.

From 1917 to 1922, Arcadia was the home of Carlstrom Field, a grass airfield of the U.S. Army Air Service named for deceased aviation pioneer Victor Carlstrom. Carlstrom Field was used for pilot training both during and after World War I. In May 1941, the site again became an airfield for military primary flight training, operated by the Embry–Riddle Aeronautical Institute (now Embry–Riddle Aeronautical University). Carlstrom Field, one of several satellite fields in the Fort Myers area, also trained pilots for the Royal Air Force until its closing in 1945.

Arcadia's historic buildings include the Johnson-Smith House, William Oswell Ralls House, and Micajah T. Singleton House. Also, around 3,400 acres, which includes the downtown area, are part of the Arcadia Historic District.

After three Arcadia children, the Ray brothers, were diagnosed with HIV in 1986, school officials refused to let them attend school.  The Ray family won a $1.1 million judgement against the county school system, but were forced to leave Arcadia after their home was burned down in 1987.

Hurricane Charley and the 21st century
The winds were suspected to be stronger outside the city, but cannot be proven due to the lack of equipment outside the city. Everyone evacuated into the hallways and the kitchen of the Turner Center prior to the collapse. The people in the Turner Agri Civic Center were evacuated to DeSoto High School, but soon, part of its roof collapsed. In the center of the town, the Old Opera House's roof was peeled off, causing severe water damage. The hurricane severely damaged downtown, especially businesses on Oak Street and Polk Street. Eventually, the Red Cross shelter was forced to evacuate due to the collapsing of the building. The city water tower crumpled along Florida State Road 70 and was never replaced after the hurricane. The city's only hospital was heavily damaged, with 35 windows shattering. Part of the roof peeled back, which exposed equipment and patients to the wind-driven rain. This caused an estimated $2.3 million in damages to the hospital. Hurricane Charley caused 3,600 homes to be destroyed or heavily damaged, and displaced 16,000 people. The exact amount of damage is not known, but it was ln the millions of dollars. Two people died in DeSoto County during the storm, and 150 people were injured. Many residents of the town left and never came back.  

After Hurricane Charley, the people in DeSoto High School were taken to the middle school nearby, where at least 75 people spent the night in the Middle School's gymnasium. The hurricane caused downtown to be heavily damaged. The storm caused 90% of homes in DeSoto County to be damaged and 60% to be uninhabitable or destroyed. The National Guard was deployed to the city and started the cleanup process and enforced a strict curfew in the city. The people of Arcadia came together and started helping each other after the storm, from feeding people to rebuilding. Although during the rebuilding process, the first wave of the Great Recession began, the people of Arcadia were able to rebuild their homes and bring new homes to the city. Downtown Arcadia was rebuilt, but some parts of the county are still damaged from Hurricane Charley. About 12 years were needed to rebuild, but parts of the city and county are still damaged from it. 

In 2017, Hurricane Irma went over the city as a category 1 hurricane. It did not cause a huge amount of damage to the city. Some of the downtown area was damaged, with the Oak Park Inn taking considerable damage, and was not able to open for 4 months after the storm. Parts of DeSoto County were flooded, especially communities on the Peace River. The storm dropped 10-15 in of rain near Morgan Park on the Peace River. The river and its tributaries flooded roadways, homes, and parks. The damage extent is unknown.  

In March 2020, Arcadia declared a local state of emergency in response to the COVID-19 pandemic. DeSoto county has had 10,174 cases of COVID-19.

On September 28, 2022, Hurricane Ian Made Landfall near Cayo Costa, Florida. The Hurricane struck as a strong Category 4 Hurricane, near Category 5 strength. The storm would go over the city of Arcadia as a Category 3 Hurricane. The Hurricane would cause major flooding along the Peace River, flooding homes and roads near or on the river. SR-72 collapsed, and buildings and homes in Arcadia would be damaged.

Geography
Arcadia is located slightly northwest of the center of DeSoto County at 27°13'N 81°52'W (27.2176, –81.8599). The Peace River flows past the west side of the city on its way southwest to tidewater at Punta Gorda.

U.S. Route 17 passes through the center of Arcadia, leading north  to Bartow and southwest  to its terminus at Punta Gorda. Florida State Road 70 crosses US 17 in the center of Arcadia and leads east  to Okeechobee and west-northwest  to South Bradenton.

Demographics

As of the 2020 census, the city had a population of 7,420 people and 2,953 households. About 5.1% of the population were under 5 years old, 26.2% were under 18, and 13.7% were 65 and over; 49.9% of the population were female.

About 70.9% of the population were White, 19.5% were Black or African American, 0.3% were Asian, 6.2% were two or more races, and 34.2% were Hispanic or Latino of any race.  In total, 256 veterans were living in the city and 14.7% of the population were foreign-born. About 69.5% of the households had a computer and 58.0% had a broadband internet subscription.  Around 80.9% of the population 25 and older were high-school graduates and 15.2% of that same population had a bachelor's degree or higher. Around7.4% of the population under 65 had a disability and 17.3% of that same population did not have health insurance. 

The median household income was $34,003 and the per capita income was $18,376; 30.2% of the population lived below the poverty threshold.

Government
The City of Arcadia was created by an act of the Florida Legislature in 1886. Currently, the city is governed by a council/manager form of government, with five council members elected at large to four-year terms of office, who in turn appoint a city manager to run the daily operation of the city. The council annually chooses a mayor and deputy mayor, who serve in the capacity of chairman of meetings and at ceremonial functions. Also elected by the residents is a city marshal who acts as chief of police. In addition to police service, the city provides residents with a water/sewer system, trash pickup, planning and zoning services, and public works.

Transportation
The City of Arcadia operates the day-to-day operations of the airport. The airport has a deep history of aviation, with the old Carlstrom and Dorr training fields in DeSoto County. It is leading the state in low fuel prices and has a fly-in and camp facility called Aviation City. Arcadia Municipal Airport hosts an annual Aviation Day event in March. The event consists of a static display of aircraft, biplane rides, helicopter rides, and a skydiving demonstration, but bigger plans are in the works.

Recreation and events
Arcadia is located on the Peace River, the major tributary of the Charlotte Harbor estuary. The river offers fine canoeing, shark-tooth hunting, and natural habitats. Tours, recreational accessories, and accommodations are readily available.

Arcadia hosts DeSoto County's annual fair usually in the month of January. While traditional aspects of a fair or carnival are provided, the event also presents livestock shows consisting of swine and cattle, which are presented by the local FFA and 4-H.

Arcadia is also the home of three rodeos. These events, which are managed by the local rodeo association, occur during the month of March, the Fourth of July holiday, and in the fall. From the profits of these events many local charities, college scholarships and causes receive funding.

Arcadia is one of the largest groupings of antique dealers in the state, all located conveniently in the downtown area. The local dealers' association sponsors a "4th Saturday Antique Fair" each month from 8 am to 3 pm, bringing an additional 60 to 120 independent dealers in for the event.

Arcadia has numerous parades throughout the year—a Martin Luther King Jr. Day parade, a March rodeo parade, a Cinco de Mayo parade, an Independence Day parade, an October Homecoming parade, a Veterans Day parade, and a Christmas parade.

Media
 WCXS (1480 Classic Country)
 WSRQ-FM (106.9 SRQ)
 WZSP-FM (105.3 La Zeta)
 The Arcadian, local print newspaper

Notable people

 Al Alberts - lead singer of the Four Aces
 Brian Labrie  - reality TV star and world record holder from the Science Channel’s Punkin’Chunkin’ TV show
 Chris Clemons - professional football player for the NFL Miami Dolphins and Arizona Cardinals
 James L. Dozier - retired US Army general
 Bitsy Mott - born in Arcadia, Major League Baseball player
* James Joseph Richardson, man wrongly convicted of poisoning his seven young children in October 1967
 John Paul Riddle - co-founder of Embry-Riddle Aeronautical University
 Brad Scott - former coach at  Clemson Tigers
 Jeff Scott - head football coach of the South Florida Bulls
 Chesterfield Smith -  president of the American Bar Association in 1973–1974

Christina Bohannan, Iowa House of Representatives and Candidate for Congress in Iowa's 1st Congressional District in 2022

Climate
According to the Köppen climate classification, Arcadia has a humid subtropical climate (Cfa), with hot, humid summers and warm, drier winters.

References

External links

 City of Arcadia official website
 DeSoto Arts and Humanities Council
 DeSoto County Historical Society
 Desoto County Tourism Development Council
 Directory of the Peace River Valley

County seats in Florida
Cities in DeSoto County, Florida
Micropolitan areas of Florida
Cities in Florida
1886 establishments in Florida
Populated places established in 1886